Brachyopa stackelbergi is an Asian species of hoverfly.

Distribution
Tajikistan.

References

Diptera of Asia
Eristalinae
Insects described in 2004